I'm Good Now is the sixth solo (and 4th studio) album from Bob Schneider, released April 13, 2004 through Shockorama Records and distributed by Vanguard. It was described by Allmusic.com as ' quite varied, echoing several singer/songwriter traditions', while popmatters found it 'an impressive batch of songs'. On the lyrics Schneider explained that 'none of them are autobiographical. They are all different narrators, they are all different personas'. No Depression magazine found the collection of song perhaps too eclectic and saying that 'even the most patient listener's endurance has been sorely, and possibly fatally, tested' towards the end. The album was awarded 'Album of the Year' at the Austin Music Awards of 2004. The album was produced by Billy Harvey, and featured contributions by Rafael Gayol and the Tosca String Quartet. The song "Love Is Everywhere" was featured in the film All About Steve.

Track listing
All songs written by Bob Schneider.

Personnel
Bob Scheider - vocals, guitars, bass, keyboards, drums and percussion.
Billy Harvey - guitars, bass, keyboards, drums and percussion.
Adam Temple - guitar
Charles Reiser - guitar 
Dave McNair - guitar
Bruce Hughes - bass, vocals
Derek Morris - piano
Kevin Lovejoy - organ
David Boyle - keyboards
David Robinson - drums 
Michael Longoria - drums
Rafael Gayol - drums and percussion
Danny Levin - cello and arrangement on "Love Is Everywhere".
Tosca String Quartet - strings

Technical
Billy Harvey - production/engineering 
Bob Schneider - production 
Dave McNair - engineering/mixing
Jay Hudson - assistant engineering
Max Crace - assistant engineering  
Noah Simon  - assistant engineering
Rafael Laski - assistant engineering

References

2004 albums
Bob Schneider albums